Ese Que Va Por Ahí is the 2nd album by British-Venezuelan singer-songwriter Jeremías released on May 2, 2006.

Track listing

 Uno y Uno Es Igual Tres
 Dime
 Yo Solo Se Que Solo No Se Nada
 Ese Que Va Por Ahí
 Mientras Tanto
 Ahora
 Sin Despedirte
 Tiempo
 Demonios
 Igual Que Ayer
 Hay Un Amor Afuera
 Desde Mi Balcón
 Yo Solo Se Que Solo No Se Nada (Remix)

2006 albums
Jeremías albums